Karla Crater is a meteorite impact crater in Tatarstan, Russia.

It is 10 km in diameter and the age is estimated to be 5 ± 1 million years old (probably Pliocene). The crater is exposed at the surface.

References 

Impact craters of Russia
Zanclean
Landforms of Tatarstan